The 1902 Georgia Tech football team represented the Georgia Institute of Technology during the 1902 Southern Intercollegiate Athletic Association football season. Jesse Thrash was the school's first All-Southern player.

Schedule

References

Georgia Tech
Georgia Tech Yellow Jackets football seasons
College football winless seasons
Georgia Tech football